Guinea Creek is a  long 1st order tributary to Herring Creek in Sussex County, Delaware, United States.

Variant names
According to the Geographic Names Information System, it has also been known historically as:  
Goldsmith Branch

Course
Guinea Creek rises on the Emily Gut divide, about 0.1 miles southeast of Holiday Pines in Sussex County, Delaware.  Guinea Creek then flows generally east to meet Herring Creek about 0.5 miles southwest of Angola Landing.

Watershed
Guinea Creek drains  of area, receives about 44.9 in/year of precipitation, has a topographic wetness index of 635.57 and is about 24.6% forested.

See also
List of rivers of Delaware

References 

Rivers of Delaware